Primephonic was a classical music streaming service. Envisioned as a supplement to major streaming services, Primephonic aimed to address the classical music niche with search features customized for the genre, hand-coded metadata, and compensation for artists based on time streamed, not tracks played.

On August 30, 2021, Apple Inc. announced that they had acquired the company. Access to the service was ended on September 7, 2021. Apple Music planned to integrate Primephonic's assets into a similar classical music streaming service in 2022 but the services release date was not announced until 2023 to be released March 28, 2023. This app will use much of the music and data from Primephonic.

References

Further reading

External links 
 

Music streaming services
Classical music
2021 mergers and acquisitions
Apple Inc. acquisitions
Defunct online companies of the United States